Das Milliardensouper is a 1923 German silent comedy film directed by Victor Janson and starring Ossi Oswalda, Georg Alexander	and Paul Biensfeldt.

The film's sets were designed by the art director Jacek Rotmil.

Cast
 Ossi Oswalda	
 Georg Alexander		
 Paul Biensfeldt
 Victor Janson	
 Julius Falkenstein	
 Hans Junkermann	
 Hanni Reinwald
 Robert Stolz

References

Bibliography
 Bock, Hans-Michael & Bergfelder, Tim. The Concise CineGraph. Encyclopedia of German Cinema. Berghahn Books, 2009.

External links

1923 films
Films of the Weimar Republic
German silent feature films
Films directed by Victor Janson
German black-and-white films
UFA GmbH films
1920s German films